The Campeonato Brasileiro Série B is commonly referred to as the Brasileirão Série B (Série B), and until 2022 was officially called Brasileirão Sportingbet by sponsorship reasons. It is the second tier of the Brazilian football league system. Although not having been played annually since its founding in 1971, the competition format has changed almost every season. Since 2006 it has been contested by 20 teams in a double round-robin format with the top four teams being promoted to the Campeonato Brasileiro Série A group and the bottom four teams being relegated to the Campeonato Brasileiro Série C group.

2022 Série B teams

Champions of Série B

Official champions

Below is the table of the Campeonato Brasileiro Série B champions according to the Brazilian Football Confederation:

Knockout tournament

Round-robin tournament

Notes

In 1986, Treze, Central, Inter de Limeira and Criciúma were the champions of their respective groups and were promoted to the first level in the same year. Confederação Brasileira de Futebol is yet to recognize these titles. 

In 1987, Americano and Operário–MS each won their groups (White and Blue respectively) as well.

In 2000, Paraná defeated São Caetano in the Final of the Yellow Module of the Copa João Havelange and both, plus Remo, who finished third were promoted to Knockout Stage of the Série A in the same year. However only São Caetano and Paraná remained in the Série A in 2001 season. São Caetano later became the runner-up of the first division in the same year that became the runner-up of the second division. Confederação Brasileira de Futebol is yet to recognize this title.

Unofficial champions

The following seasons are not officially recognized by the CBF:

Titles by team
Below are the titles by team, according to the Brazilian Football Confederation:

Titles by state
Below are the titles by state, according to the Brazilian Football Confederation:

Participations

Most appearances

Below is the list of clubs that have more appearances in the Campeonato Brasileiro Série B.

Top scorers

1 Módulo Amarelo of the Copa João Havelange. Adhemar scored another six goals in the Knockout Stage of the Copa João Havelange.

Media Coverage

See also
 Campeonato Brasileiro Série A, the main division of Brazilian football
 Campeonato Brasileiro Série C, the third division of Brazilian football
 Campeonato Brasileiro Série D, the fourth division of Brazilian football
 Copa do Brasil, the main knockout football competition of Brazilian football

References

External links

 CBF Confederação Brasileira de Futebol - Brazilian Football Confederation
 RSSSF Brazil links

 
2
2
Brazil
Professional sports leagues in Brazil